Américo González may refer to:

 Américo González (footballer), Salvadoran footballer
 Américo González (pentathlete) (born 1925), Uruguayan modern pentathlete